Lee Correctional Institution is a high-security state prison for men located in Bishopville, South Carolina. On April 15, 2018, seven inmates were killed in the Lee Correctional Prison Riot. It was the deadliest U.S. prison riot in the past 25 years.

History 
The facility opened in 1993 to replace the decommissioned Central Correctional Institution which had been the state's primary prison for over 130 years. At the time, Lee cost $46 million dollars to construct. It remains the largest maximum-security prisons for males in the South Carolina state system. It is often characterized as being the most dangerous.

Prisoners took control over portions of the prison on two separate incidents prior to the 2018 riot which was the deadliest U.S. prison riot in the past 25 years. The prison has had a long history of violent incidents. 

The riot was the inspiration for the 2018 U.S. prison strike.

Further reading

See also
 Attica Prison riot
Lee Correctional Prison Riot

References

External links 
 South Carolina Department of Corrections 

State prisons in South Carolina
Buildings and structures in Lee County, South Carolina
1993 establishments in South Carolina